Cazenovia Park–South Park System is a historic park system located in the South Buffalo neighborhood at Buffalo in Erie County, New York.  The interconnected set of parkways and parks was designed by Frederick Law Olmsted as part of his parks plan for the city of Buffalo, as inspired in large part by the parkland, boulevards, and squares of Paris, France.

Components
The park system was listed on the National Register of Historic Places in 1982, and consists of the following elements:

Heacock Place
A  park site that forms the beginning of the Cazenovia Park–South Park System.

McKinley Parkway
Connects Heacock Place to South Park. Named for President William McKinley (formerly Southside Pkwy) 
y).

McClellan Circle
A  right-of-way at the juncture of McKinley Parkway, Red Jacket Parkway, Choate Avenue, and Whitfield Avenue.  Named for General George B. McClellan (formerly Woodside Circle).

Red Jacket Parkway
Connects McClellan Circle to Cazenovia Park.  Named for Seneca orator Red Jacket.

Cazenovia Park
An irregularly shaped rectangular parkland plot bisected by Cazenovia Creek. The park features a branch of the Buffalo & Erie County Public Library, swimming pool, golf course, and baseball fields. Contributing structures are the Cazenovia Park Casino (1912) and Shelter House (1902).

McKinley Circle
Traversed by McKinley Parkway and Dorrance Avenue; connects McKinley Parkway to South Park (formerly South Parkway Circle).

South Park
The main entrance is at the intersection of McKinley Parkway and South Park Avenue. The park is home to the Buffalo and Erie County Botanical Gardens. Recreational development of the park began in 1915 with the golf course. Contributing structures are the South Park Botanical Gardens Conservatory (1889, rebuilt 1930) and Golf Shelter (ca. 1927).

See also
Buffalo, New York parks system
Delaware Park–Front Park System

References

External links
Buffalo Olmsted Parks Conservancy - Buffalo, NY, Western New York, WNY, Olmsted, Frederick Law
Buffalo as an Architectural Museum, South Buffalo and South Park
"Municipal Parks and City Planning: Frederick Law Olmsted's Buffalo Park and Parkway System," by Francis R. Kowsky, Reprinted with permission from the Journal of the Society of Architectural Historians, March 1987.
South Park Golf Club

Parks on the National Register of Historic Places in New York (state)
Geography of Buffalo, New York
Parks in Erie County, New York
Frederick Law Olmsted works
National Register of Historic Places in Buffalo, New York